Simpi is a village in the Rallawn Village Tract in Falam Township, Falam District, Chin State, Myanmar, about  south-east of the town of Falam.

Notes

External links
 "Simpi Map — Satellite Images of Simpi original name: Simpi" Maplandia World Gazetteer

Populated places in Chin State